Jurga may refer to
First name
Jurga Ivanauskaitė (1961–2007), Lithuanian writer
Jurga Zilinskiene (born 1976), Lithuanian entrepreneur
Jurga Šeduikytė (born 1980), Lithuanian singer and songwriter

Last name
Ursula Jurga, German rower

Lithuanian feminine given names